Xanthoparmelia cumberlandia is a lichen which belongs to the Xanthoparmelia genus. It is also known as a member of the rockfrong lichens due to its coloration.

Description 
Grows to around 6–12 cm in diameter with irregular lobate lobes. The upper surface of the lichen has rounded lobed tips with yellow-green or blueish green areas on the surface.

Habitat and range 
Commonly found attached to acid rocks in sheltered and semi-sheltered open coastal and intermontane areas at lower elevations as such it is commonly found in across North America except in deserts and open plains.

Chemistry 
Xanthoparmelia cumberlandia produces constictic, norstictic, stictic, norstictic, usnic and menegazzic acids.

Taxonomy 
The lichen was first formally described under the name Parmelia cumberlandia in 1847.

See also 
 List of Xanthoparmelia species

References 

cumberlandia
Lichen species
Lichens of North America
Lichens described in 1934